The mimic tree rat, rock-dwelling giant rat, or rock-dwelling rat (Xenuromys barbatus) is a species of rodent in the family Muridae found in West Papua, Indonesia and Papua New Guinea.

References

Old World rats and mice
Rodents of Papua New Guinea
Mammals of Western New Guinea
Mammals described in 1900
Taxonomy articles created by Polbot
Rodents of New Guinea
Taxa named by Alphonse Milne-Edwards